Alfredo Mario Ferreiro (1 March 1899 – 24 June 1959) was a Uruguayan writer and poet.

He contributed to the weekly Uruguayan newspaper Marcha.

Works
The man who ate a bus (subtitled Poems smelling gasoline) (The Southern Cross. Montevideo 1927.)
Please do not shake hands (subtitled Poems images based prophylactic buffed) (1930)

20th-century Uruguayan poets
Uruguayan male poets
1899 births
1959 deaths
Writers from Montevideo
20th-century Uruguayan male writers